Carlos Fabián Maldonado (born 30 July 1963) is a Venezuelan football manager and former player who played as a central midfielder.

Maldonado was nicknamed "Carlitos" during his playing career.

Club career
Born in Montevideo, Uruguay, Maldonado played professional football in Venezuela, Argentina, Brazil and Colombia.

International career
He obtained a total number of 20 caps for the Venezuela national football team, scoring four goals. All his goals came at the 1989 Copa América.

Personal life
He is the father of Giancarlo Maldonado, who also started a professional football career.

References

External links

1963 births
Living people
Footballers from Montevideo
Venezuelan footballers
Venezuela international footballers
Venezuelan expatriate footballers
Association football midfielders
1987 Copa América players
1989 Copa América players
1991 Copa América players
Expatriate footballers in Argentina
Expatriate footballers in Brazil
Campeonato Brasileiro Série A players
Expatriate footballers in Colombia
Venezuelan expatriate sportspeople in Argentina
Venezuelan expatriate sportspeople in Brazil
Venezuelan expatriate sportspeople in Colombia
Deportivo Táchira F.C. players
Independiente Santa Fe footballers
Fluminense FC players
Caracas FC players
Categoría Primera A players
Venezuelan football managers
Mineros de Guayana managers
UA Maracaibo managers
Deportivo Táchira F.C. managers
Zulia F.C. managers
Academia Puerto Cabello managers
Aragua F.C. managers